Born & Raised is the second studio album by German recording artist Joy Denalane. It was released by Nesola Records and Four Music on August 11, 2006 in German-speaking Europe, featuring production by No I.D., Jake One, BAB Gardeat and executive producer Max Herre. American rappers Lupe Fiasco, Raekwon and Governor appear as guest vocalists on the album. The album reached number 2 on the Media Control albums chart, making it Denalane's highest-charting record to date, and spawned four singles: "Let Go", Raekwon-cover "Heaven or Hell", "Sometimes Love" and "Change".
"Change" was featured in the 2008 blockbuster film Taken directed by Pierre Morel starring Liam Neeson. The song was played twice, once during the birthday party and again during the concert.

Track listing

Notes and sample credits
 denotes additional producer
"Change" contains an interlopation of "I Want to Go Back" originally recorded by The Impressions. 
"Let Go" contains an interlopation of "Love Gonna Pack Up" originally recorded by Sly, Slick and Wicked.
"Heaven or Hell" contains an interpolation of "I Hate I Walked Away" originally recorded by Syl Johnson.
"One in a Million" contains an interpolation of "I Can't Go On Living Without You" originally recorded by Tavares.
"For the Love" contains an interpolation of "Together Let's Find Love" originally recorded by The 5th Dimension.
"Caught Up" contains an interpolation of "Let Me Down Easy" originally recorded by Bettye LaVette. 
"Something Stirrin' Up" contains an interpolation of "Crying" originally recorded by Rose Royce for the soundtrack of Car Wash (1976).
"Soweto '76 – '06" contains an interpolation of "Eltsuhg Ibal Lasiti" originally by The Daktaris.

Credits and personnel

 Dan Abitol — violin
 Odile Biard — violin
 Felix Borel — violin
 Ian Cumming — trombone
 Kathrin Distler — cello
 Andreas Fischer — viola
 Klaus Graf — saxophone
 Michael Kedaisch — marimba
 Franc Kuruc — guitar
 Tom Krüger — bass
 Dalma Lima — percussion
 Klaus Graf — saxophone
 Max Herre — executive producer

 Chiwoniso Maraire — mbira
 Klaus Marquardt — violin
 Claudia Pfister — violin
 Don Phillipe — wurlitzer
 Raphael Sacha — viola
 Christoph Sauer — bass
 Violina Sauleva — viola
 Lillo Scrimali — piano, organ, synthesizer
 Tim Ströble — cello
 Sebastian Studinitzky — horn
 Myriam Trück — violin
 Matthias Trück — cello
 Tommy W. — drums

Charts

Weekly charts

Year-end charts

Certifications

References

External links
 JoyDenalane.com — official site
 

2006 albums
Joy Denalane albums
Albums produced by Jake One
Albums produced by No I.D.